Charles Williamson (born 12 April 1956) is a Scottish former professional footballer who played in the Football League, as a defender.

References

Sources

1956 births
Living people
Footballers from Falkirk
Scottish footballers
Association football fullbacks
Bristol City F.C. players
Torquay United F.C. players
Falkirk F.C. players
English Football League players
Scottish Football League players